The Cessna Citation Sovereign (Model 680) is an American business jet developed by Cessna, part of the Cessna Citation family.
Announced at the 1998 NBAA convention, the Model 680 made its maiden flight in February 2002, certification was awarded on June 2, 2004, and deliveries began in late September.

The Citation Excel fuselage was stretched and joined with an all-new, larger wing and more powerful Pratt & Whitney Canada PW306C engines for increased maximum takeoff weight and a  range.

The improved Sovereign+ was announced at the October 2012 NBAA for a first flight in April 2013 and deliveries in December, with added winglets and an improved flight deck and engines.

Development

In the late 1990s, Cessna wanted to fill a gap in its midsize line-up as demand for its Cessna Citation III/VI/VII waned, with greater cabin comfort, performance and utility with Citation reliability, good runway performance, near transcontinental flight range to compete with the Hawker 800, and a thrust-to-weight ratio to rival the climb performance of the Learjet 60.

The Citation Sovereign was announced at the 1998 NBAA convention, it made its maiden flight in February 2002, and deliveries began in late September 2004.
FAA certification was awarded on June 2, 2004.
EASA certification came on 31 March 2005.

The improved Sovereign+ was announced at the October 2012 NBAA, it rolled out in early March 2013, first flew in April, and began deliveries on December 23 after certification, at a time when the Sovereign fleet reached 349 and had flown 802,000 hours.

In March 2021, Cessna announced that Sovereign+ production had ended to reduce market overlap between it and the similarly capable but more recently-developed Citation Latitude and Citation Longitude. 349 Sovereign and 94 Sovereign+ aircraft were produced.

Design
The Citation Excel fuselage was stretched for a  longer cabin and joined with a large, newly-designed  wing with large trailing edge flaps for good runway performance, with 16.3° wing sweep and a relatively high critical Mach number for efficient  TAS cruise.
It is powered by  Pratt & Whitney Canada PW306C engines, derated from the Gulfstream G200 or Do 328JET, and uses Honeywell Primus Epic glass cockpit avionics with four LCD screens.
The cabin maintains a  altitude with the  pressurization and typically comprise double-club seating for eight, two more than the Gulfstream G150, plus a side facing seat, and can accommodate up to 11.

It travels  in the first hour while burning  at FL410,  the second hour with  the third hour at FL430.

Operations

Basic maintenance is due at 400 hr or every 12 months and dispatch reliability is over 99%.
The Learjet 60 cruises faster with less fuel but its cabin is smaller, the slower Hawker 900XP has  less range and a wider but shorter cabin
like the Gulfstream G150 which has more range, speed and fuel economy.
In 2017, the Sovereign were sold from $5 to $9 million for early 2004 models to 2013 aircraft.

In 2013, two-thirds of the fleet was in the U.S. with NetJets as its largest operator with 44.
In Americas, 20 were in Brazil, 12 in Canada and eight in Mexico. In Europe, ten were in U.K., nine in Germany, three in Prague and in Austria, two in the Netherlands. In Africa, eight were in Egypt, four in South Africa and one in Morocco. In Asia, eight were in Turkey, five in China, three in Australia and one in Jordan.
Most corporate operators fly the aircraft 350- to 400-hr. per year, less for individuals while fractional ownership and air charter aircraft may be used 1,200 hr. per year.

Operators

Japanese Air Self Defense Force - 3 U-680A Citation Sovereigns for flight inspection missions, to replace NAMC YS-11s in same role.

United States Marine Corps

Specifications (Citation Sovereign+)

See also

References

External links

 
 
 

Citation Sovereign
2000s United States business aircraft
Twinjets
Low-wing aircraft
Cruciform tail aircraft
Sovereign
Aircraft first flown in 2002